The 2010 Harvard Crimson football team was an American football team that represented Harvard University in the 2010 NCAA Division I FCS football season. They were led by 17th-year head coach Tim Murphy and played their home games at Harvard Stadium. They finished the season with seven wins and three losses (7–3, 5–2 in Ivy League play).

Schedule

References

Harvard
Harvard Crimson football seasons
Harvard Crimson football
Harvard Crimson football